George Grenville (fl. 1571–1572) of Penheale, Cornwall, was an English politician.

He was a Member (MP) of the Parliament of England for Dunheved in 1571 and 1572. His nephew, George Grenville (died 1595), was also an MP for the same constituency.

References

Year of birth missing
Year of death missing
English MPs 1571
Politicians from Cornwall
Members of the pre-1707 English Parliament for constituencies in Cornwall